Yäsäffiw hezb dems ('Voice of the Masses') was a newspaper in Ethiopia. It was the central organ of the All-Ethiopian Socialist Movement (Meison).

Yäsäffiw hezb dems was launched as an underground weekly newspaper in August 1974, as the organ of the group that later became known as Meison. It was published in the capital despite the military regime's censorship of the press. Together with the rival Democracia, Yäsäffiw hezb dems was the most frequently distributed radical tract in Addis Ababa in the early phase of the Ethiopian revolution.

Yäsäffiw hezb dems pressured the Derg military junta to suspend the imperial constitution, depose the Emperor, nationalize industries and banks, disband the old spying networks and imprison aristocrats of the old imperial regime. In a series of articles, in particular in its October 22, 1974 and January 27, 1975 editions, Yäsäffiw hezb dems presented an elaborate criticism of the "Ethiopian Socialism" doctrine (hibrtesebawenet) of the Derg junta. The newspaper argued that there could not be "Ethiopian electricity" or "Somali electricity". Rather Yäsäffiw hezb dems argued in favour of scientific socialism.

By late 1975, the feud between Meison and its main adversary on the left, the Ethiopian People's Revolutionary Party (EPRP), became public and attacks on EPRP frequently appeared in Yäsäffiw hezb dems.

MEISON published its withdrawal of "critical support" to the Derg in its August 19, 1977 edition of Yäsäffiw hezb dems.

References

External links
No. 1, 2005 (Ethiopian Calendar) PDF edition

Weekly newspapers published in Ethiopia
Communist newspapers
Publications established in 1974
Amharic-language newspapers
Underground press
Defunct newspapers published in Ethiopia